Two referendums were held in Switzerland in 2007. The first was held on 11 March on an amendment to articles 117 and 197 of the Swiss Federal Constitution regarding health insurance, which would have merged existing health insurance companies into a single public insurer, with premiums based on income. The proposal was rejected by 71% of voters.

The second was held on 17 June on an amendment to the disability law, and was approved by 59% of voters.

Results

References

2007 referendums
2007 elections in Switzerland
Referendums in Switzerland